Morgongiori is a comune (municipality) in the Province of Oristano in the Italian region Sardinia, located about  northwest of Cagliari and about  southeast of Oristano on the southern slopes of Monte Arci.

Morgongiori borders the following municipalities: Ales, Curcuris, Marrubiu, Masullas, Pompu, Santa Giusta, Siris, Uras.

References

Cities and towns in Sardinia